DisneyWar is a book that serves as an exposé of Michael Eisner's 20-year tenure as chairman and CEO at The Walt Disney Company by James B. Stewart. The book chronicles the careers and interactions of executives at Disney, including Card Walker, Ron W. Miller, Roy E. Disney, Frank Wells, Jeffrey Katzenberg, Michael Ovitz, Joe Roth, Bob Iger and Stan Kinsey.
The book was released in 2005, and was published by Simon & Schuster. Its uniqueness was attributed to the large amount of access allowed to Stewart in putting the book together.

Content
Stewart's book describes some of the following:
 Roy E. Disney and Stanley Gold's removal of Disney CEO Ron W. Miller in 1984.
 Stan Kinsey's clash with Jeffrey Katzenberg over creating films using computer animation.
 The struggle to get Who Framed Roger Rabbit made in time and on budget despite the ambitions of Robert Zemeckis and Richard Williams to make the film bigger and bolder.
 Eisner's tension with Frank Wells before Wells's death.
 Eisner's friendship-turned-rivalry with Jeffrey Katzenberg.
 Eisner's tension with Michael Ovitz during Ovitz's short-lived presidency.
 The purchase of the ABC Family channel and content, and the fallout resulting from Disney's inability to revive it.
 Eisner attempting to shut down the first Pirates of the Caribbean movie.
 Roy E. Disney's abrupt resignation on November 30, 2003.
 The Comcast hostile takeover attempt.
 Hilary Duff's decision to quit Disney Channel because of low salary.
 Pixar's decision not to renew its relationship with Disney.
 Financing of the 2004 documentary film Fahrenheit 9/11.
 The 2004 shareholders' meeting that led to Eisner's resignation as chairman.

Reviews
A USA Today article by journalist David Lieberman stated that the story "may not sound like a page turner, but DisneyWar is." He referred to Stewart as an "accomplished storyteller who had the luck or foresight to stake out a company filled with colorful executives in a glamorous business—at the moment investors decided they had had enough".

Editions

References

2005 non-fiction books
Books about Disney
Simon & Schuster books
Books by James B. Stewart
Michael Eisner
Jeffrey Katzenberg